Tron (stylized as TRON) is an American science fiction media franchise created by Steven Lisberger, which began with the eponymous 1982 film. The original film portrays Jeff Bridges as Kevin Flynn, a genius computer programmer and video game developer who becomes transported inside a digital virtual reality known as "The Grid", where he interacts with programs in his quest to escape.

Produced and released by Walt Disney Pictures, Tron became a cult film and was acclaimed for its groundbreaking visual effects and extensive use of early computer-generated imagery. It was followed by the 2010 sequel film Tron: Legacy, which takes place 28 years after the events of the first film and depicts the attempts of Flynn's son Sam in retrieving his lost father from within the Grid, now ruled by a corrupt program.

The film series has spawned various tie-ins, including video games, a comic book miniseries, music recording albums, theme park attractions, and an animated television series that aired on Disney XD in June 2012.

Films

Tron (1982)

Tron is a 1982 American science fiction film produced by Walt Disney Pictures. It stars Jeff Bridges as Kevin Flynn, Bruce Boxleitner as Tron and his User Alan Bradley, Cindy Morgan as Yori and Dr. Lora Baines, and Dan Shor as Ram. David Warner plays all three main antagonists: the program Sark, his User Ed Dillinger, and the voice of the Master Control Program. It was written and directed by Steven Lisberger, with story by Lisberger and Bonnie MacBird, and music composed by Wendy Carlos. Tron has a distinctive visual style, as it was one of the first films from a major studio to use computer graphics extensively.

Tron: Legacy (2010)

Tron: Legacy is a 2010 science fiction film. Jeff Bridges returns as Kevin Flynn and also, in a digitally de-aged form, plays the film's antagonist, a new version of his CLU program. Bruce Boxleitner also returns as Alan Bradley and, likewise de-aged, as Tron. They are joined by Garrett Hedlund as Sam Flynn, Kevin's son, the film's primary protagonist; Olivia Wilde as digital warrior Quorra; Michael Sheen as Castor, owner of a nightclub within the Grid; and Beau Garrett as Gem, a program that works within the digital world. The film deals with Sam investigating the disappearance of his father twenty years earlier, a quest that ultimately leads him into an isolated digital world created by his father after the events of the first film. Lisberger returned as a producer and consultant on the film, written by Adam Horowitz and Edward Kitsis, directed by Joseph Kosinski, and featured original music by Daft Punk.

Tron: Ares (TBA)
In October 2010, a third film was announced to be in development, with Kosinski returning as director with a script co-written by Adam Horowitz and Edward Kitsis. In January 2011, it was announced that a short film was being made as a teaser for the third film, and that it will be released exclusively on the home media release of Legacy.  Kosinski stated in April that the script was underway, while confirming that the movie will continue on from where Tron: Legacy ended. He stated that Sam and Quorra's relationship is "the next step", with the plot following their adventures in the real world. The first draft of the script was completed, with the working title announced as "TR3N". By June 2011, David DiGilio signed on to contribute to the script, as Horowitz and Kitsis were not available for a rewrite given their commitments to the Once Upon a Time television series.  In March 2012, Bruce Boxleitner stated that filming was expected to begin in 2014, after Kosinski completes wraps working on Oblivion. In June 2012, Horowitz and Kitsis confirmed that they were still involved with the third film, while reiterating that Quorra will be one of the primary characters in the plot.

In December 2012, Jesse Wigutow was hired to rewrite the script, while Bruce Boxleitner and Garrett Hedlund were confirmed to reprise their respective roles from previous movies. In September 2013, Kosinski confirmed that work on the script was ongoing, and stated that though he does not know when production will begin, the ending of Tron: Legacy hints at the direction of the next installment. By January 2014, Boxleitner stated that though he doesn't know the entire story of the third film, that the movie will followup on what Sam states to Alan at the end of Legacy: "'We're going to take the company back.'" The actor further explains that, "…that's not the end of the movie. That's the beginning of the next one. That's foreshadowing…" while also confirming that Cillian Murphy is expected to reprise his role, stating that "Eddie Dillinger Jr.'s going to be as bad as his dad was." In March 2015, the film entered pre-production, with Hedlund and Wilde confirmed to reprise their roles from Legacy. Principal photography was scheduled to commence in October of the same year in Vancouver, Canada. The Walt Disney Company however delayed the project indefinitely in May 2015. Boxleitner expressed his distaste for the studio's decision, the project's lengthy development stage, and that he had lost interest in working on the film; stating: "I don't want to repeat my career anymore." Hedlund stated that the box office disappointments from Tomorrowland influenced the company's resolve to delay photography.

The concept and ideas for a third film continued behind the scenes, from August 2016 to March 2017, when Jared Leto was announced to have signed on to co-star as a new character named Ares. In March 2019, co-producer Justin Springer confirmed that development on the project is ongoing; stating: "…it's about finding the right time, right script, and the right people at the studio…" In June 2020 the Walt Disney Studios President of Music & Soundtracks, Mitchel Leib, stated that while the studio hopes that Kosinski will return to the franchise, the studio was searching for a director. He also confirmed that the intention was for Daft Punk to once again serve as composers on the film soundtrack score. In August 2020, it was announced that Garth Davis will serve as director with a script written by Jesse Wigutow.  In addition to Leto's role as one of the main characters, he will serve as co-producer with Justin Springer and Emma Ludbrook.

In March 2022, while promoting Morbius, Leto confirmed that the film is still happening.  By January 2023, Davis had exited as director, with Joachim Rønning entering negotiations to take the directing job.  Leto was still attached, with production planned to begin in Vancouver in August 2023.

Short film

Tron: The Next Day (2011)
The short film titled Tron: The Next Day, chronologically taking place one day after the events of Tron: Legacy, was included in all mediums of the home media release of Legacy; distributed by Walt Disney Studios Home Entertainment on April 5, 2011. The film, in addition to dealing with the immediate aftermath of Legacy, explores events that occurred between the events of the original film and its sequel. The short features the return of Dan Shor as Roy Kleinberg, and references Kevin Flynn.

Television

Tron: Uprising (2012–2013)

In March 2010, Disney announced that a TV series, entitled Tron: Uprising, was in production. The premiere aired on June 7, 2012, on Disney XD. The series was cancelled after 19 episodes with the last episode airing on January 28, 2013.

A live action television series was in development by John Ridley as a Disney+ exclusive, before the project was shelved.

Cast and characters
 A dark gray cell indicates the character was not featured in that installment.
 A  indicates a cameo appearance.
 A  indicates a performance through voice-over work.
 A  indicates an actor was uncredited for their work.
 A  indicates an actor appeared as a younger version of their character.

Reception

Box office performance

Critical and public response

Accolades
 Academy Awards

Music

Soundtracks

Other media

Video games
As video games are a key element in the films, various games based on Tron have been produced over the years. Atari initially had plans to develop a Space Paranoids adaptation, but this was canceled due to the video game crash of 1983. A complete list of the released video games, follows.

 TomyTronic Tron (1981): Takara Tomy released a tabletop VFD video game comprising three mini-games based on sequences in the movie, including: light cycles, disc combat (with elements of the movie's "Ring Game"/"Hyperball"), and attacking the MCP. The game predates the release of the movie by about a year. Grandstand distributed this game in the UK.
 Tron (1982): Developed by Midway Games as an arcade game, gameplay consisted of four mini-games based on sequences in the film.  This game earned more than the film's initial box office release.
 Tron: Deadly Discs / Tron: Maze-a-Tron / Tron: Solar Sailer (1982): Three distinct games, developed by Mattel Electronics for the Mattel Intellivision game console. and Tron: Solar Sailer. Deadly Discs was later ported to the Atari 2600. Tron: Maze-a-Tron was later released on the Mattel Intellivision and the Atari 2600, with a new title of Adventures of Tron. A version was also released for the short-lived Mattel Aquarius home computer. An official joystick resembling the Tron arcade game joystick was also created as a free giveaway in a special pack that included both Atari 2600 Tron video games.
 TomyTutor Tron (1983): Developed by Tomy, for the Tomy Tutor home computer. However, the release only had the Tron moniker in Japan. The game was released stateside with the title, Hyperspace.
 Discs of Tron (1983): Developed by Midway Games as a sequel to their initial release, the gameplay focuses on the disc-combat from the film.
 Tron 2.0 (2003): A Personal Computer game sequel released for Windows and Macintosh. In this first-person shooter game, the player takes the part of Alan Bradley's son Jet, who is pulled into the computer world to fight a computer virus. A version of this game was later ported to the Xbox and re-titled, Tron 2.0 Killer App. It features additional multiplayer modes. An almost completely different game of the same name is also available for the Game Boy Advance, where Tron and a Light Cycle program named Mercury (first seen in Tron 2.0 for the PC) fight their way through the ENCOM computer to stop a virus called The Corruptor. This game includes light cycle, battle tank, and recognizer battle modes, several security-related minigames, and the arcade games Tron and Discs of Tron. While the Game Boy Advance game is only minimally connected to the PC game, one of the 100 unlockable chips shows a picture of Jet Bradley.
 Virtual Magic Kingdom (2005): Developed by Walt Disney Parks and Resorts and Sulake Corporation Ltd., and distributed The Walt Disney Company as an online massive multiplayer game, for Microsoft Windows and Apple MacOs X PCs. The game includes a room based on Tron and featuring Recognizers and the Master Control Program (MCP). Multiple furniture items were inspired by elements of the films, with Light Cycle Chairs, Tank Chairs, a Tron Arcade Game Cabinet, Sark's Red suit, and Tron's Blue suit. VMK is closed as of May 21, 2008. Popular among fans, players attempted protesting the eventual shutdown of the game. Virtual Magic Kingdom was officially closed and discontinued on April 7, 2008.
 Kingdom Hearts II (2005): Developed by Square Enix Product Development Division 1 and distributed by Square Enix, the game features an action role-playing genre for the Sony PlayStation 2. Tron appears in the "Space Paranoids" level of the game, featuring elements from the fictional video game from the movie, alongside other Tron characters including Commander Sark and the Master Control Program (MCP). The game was later remastered and expanded with later editions released on Sony: PlayStation 3, and PlayStation 4; and Microsoft: Xbox One game consoles. The game, alongside the various other Kingdom Hearts games, received critical acclaim.
 Space Paranoids (2009): Developed by 42 Entertainment, a limited number of eight real-life arcade machines based on the games from the original movie, during the 2009 San Diego Comic Con. The machines were placed in a recreated Flynn's Arcade near the center of the convention.  The gameplay includes a goal of defeating levels, while achieving as many points as possible by destroying Recognizers. The maximum number of points a person can achieve is 999 000 pts. This is reference to the score Flynn reached in the film, and is a record currently held by the gamer with the initials FLN. The controls consist of a pilot-like joystick and a ball, which moves the turret and tank.
 Tron: Evolution (2010): Developed by Propaganda Games and released as a tie-in video game and based on Tron: Legacy, available on Microsoft Windows for a PC, PlayStation 3, PlayStation Portable, and Xbox 360 game consoles. The gameplay is an action adventure genre game, that features a third person camera perspective, and heavily references the film. The game developers touted that a player of the game would understand the movie on a deeper degree.
 Tron Evolution: Battle Grids (2010): Developed by n-Space Inc. and distributed by Disney Interactive Studios, as a Nintendo exclusive for their Wii and DS game consoles. The plot, which takes place before Legacy, includes a device where the user creates their own 'program' character, who meets and interacts with Quorra and Tron.
 Epic Mickey (2010): Developed by Junction Point Studios and distributed by Disney Interactive Studios, the title features a platform gameplay style. Inspired by and based on The Walt Disney Company history, the game features various Tron elements in its Tomorrow City level. Spatter enemies wear the red suits of Sark's minions, while one of the robotic Beetleworx of the area has a light cycle-inspired torso. The boss of the level is Petetronic, a version of Pete in the style of Sark.  To beat Petetronic, the player must deflect his disc attacks and change his circuitry colors to blue, which shuts down his villainous coding. The character becomes a Master Control Program, in the alternate ending of the game. The game earned average to good critical reviews.
 Disney Universe (2011): Developed by Eurocom and distributed by Disney Interactive Studios for the Sony PlayStation 3, Nintendo Wii, Microsoft Xbox 360 game consoles, as well as Microsoft Windows for PCs. The title genre, is a co-operative action-adventure platform gameplay. Abstract versions of Tron: Legacy characters appear during the plot. Disney Universe was met with mixed critical reception. The game was later remastered for the PlayStation 3, and is available via the PlayStation Store.
 Kingdom Hearts 3D: Dream Drop Distance (2012): Developed by Square Enix 1st Production Department and distributed by Square Enix, the title is an action role-playing video game released on the Nintendo 3DS game console.  Elements from the films included in the plot, include a level named The Grid, inspired by and featuring elements from Tron: Legacy; and features the characters Kevin Flynn, Sam Flynn, Quorra, CLU, Rinzler, and the Black Guards. The game was met with positive critical reception. The game was ported and included in the Kingdom Hearts HD 2.8 Final Chapter Prologue re-released, as well as the Kingdom Hearts: The Story So Far and the Kingdom Hearts: All-in-One-Package collection bundles for the Sony PlayStation 4 and Microsoft Xbox One game consoles.
 Disney Infinity (2013–2016): Developed by Avalanche Software and distributed by Disney Interactive Studios for the Microsoft: Xbox 360 and Xbox One; Nintendo: 3DS, Wii, and Wii U; Sony: PlayStation 3, PlayStation 4, and PlayStation Vita; as well as Microsoft Windows for PCs, Apple iOS for iPhones, Android, and Apple TV for Apple products. The title features an action-adventure toys-to-life-sandbox genre, with elements and characters unlocked through purchasing the various physical figurines and action figures to interact with the game.  The plot includes several Tron-based items: the Identity Disc (weapon pack), Light Runner (ground vehicle), Recognizer (aerial vehicle), and three Power Discs (including: User Control for increased experience, the Grid skydome, and TRON terrain). In the Disney Infinity 3.0 expansion, Sam Flynn and Quorra were added as purchasable/playable characters, with the Light Cycle. The game was met with positive critical reception. Despite the game's popularity, Avalanche Software was closed and the franchise ultimately retired on May 11, 2016.
 Tron: RUN/r (2016): Developed by Sanzaru Games and distributed by Disney Interactive Studios, available on the Sony PlayStation 4 and Microsoft Xbox One game consoles, as well as on Microsoft Windows for a PC. The gameplay genre is an action-arcade endless runner game, and was met with mixed critical reception.
Fortnite Battle Royale (2017): Developed and published by Epic Games for PC, PlayStation 4, PlayStation 5, Xbox One, Xbox Series X/S, Nintendo Switch, and Android. The game is part of the Battle Royale genre. In Chapter 2 – Season 5, multiple Tron themed cosmetic items were introduced to the game's Item Shop. These included 10 different characters wearing the outfit worn by Grid Warriors in Tron: Legacy, an Identity Disc Back Bling and Pickaxe, and a Light Cycle glider. The cosmetic items were introduced on February 11, 2021, and could be purchased with V-Bucks, the in-game currency. The characters were brought into the Fortnite universe by Agent John Jones via the Zero Point, and were recruited to prevent anyone from escaping "The Loop".
Tron: Identity (2023): Developed by Bithell Games. Described as a visual novel adventure, the title follows Query, a detective program that must solve an unprecedented crime in The Grid. It is slated for a 2023 release on PC and Switch.

Theme park attractions
From 1982 to 1995, Tron was featured in Disneyland's PeopleMover attraction, as part of The World of Tron, in which the light cycle sequence from the film was projected around park guests as their vehicle passed through a tunnel on the upper level of the Carousel Theater, placing the PeopleMover in the role of a light cycle. The attraction was known as PeopleMover Thru the World of Tron after this sequence was added. From 1977 to 1982, this segment was previously home to the "SuperSpeed Tunnel," in which race cars were projected around the vehicles.

In 2010, the Epcot Monorail on the Walt Disney World Monorail System received wrap advertisements featuring blue and yellow light cycles on either side of the train to promote Tron: Legacy.

ElecTRONica was announced on the Disney Parks Blog for Disney California Adventure in Anaheim, California. Disney's ElecTRONica is an interactive nighttime dance party in the Hollywood Pictures Backlot. It is a similar experience to Glow Fest, but with a focus on Tron: Legacy. ElecTRONica features lights, lasers, music, and projections to promote the film. On October 29, 2010, the nighttime show World of Color began soft-openings, which included a Tron: Legacy-themed encore using Daft Punk's original music from the soundtrack and new effects and projections on various Paradise Pier attractions. The segment was added on November 1, 2010, and ended on March 23, 2011. ElecTRONica ended on April 15, 2012, and was replaced by Mad T Party.

In 2016, a roller coaster called Tron Lightcycle Power Run opened in Shanghai Disneyland. Guests board single-seat motorbike roller coasters modeled after light cycles and manufactured by Vekoma. A cloned version of the ride will open at the Magic Kingdom in April 2023. The ride had previews from February 6 to March 3, 2023, exclusively for Walt Disney World employees.

Novels
A novelization of Tron was released in 1982, written by American science fiction novelist Brian Daley. It included eight pages of color photographs from the movie. Also that year, Disney Senior Staff Publicist Michael Bonifer authored a book entitled The Art of Tron which covered aspects of the pre-production and post-production aspects of Tron. To support the film's release in 1982, Disney also published several books targeting children, including Tron: A Pop-Up Book, Tron: The Storybook, and The Story of Tron, a book and audio combination (with either 33 RPM 7 inch record or audio cassette).

A nonfiction book about the making of the original film, called The Making of Tron: How Tron Changed Visual Effects and Disney Forever was published in 2011 and written by William Kallay.

In 2010, to coincide with the release of Tron: Legacy, a range of new books have been released; including a range of junior novels – Tron: The Junior Novel by Alice Alfonsi, Tron: Legacy – Derezzed by James Gelsey, Tron: Legacy – Out of the Dark by Tennant Redbank, Tron: Legacy – It's Your Call: Initiate Sequence by Carla Jablonski. Additional books include The Art of Tron: Legacy by Justin Springer, Joseph Kosinski, and Darren Gilford, and Tron Legacy: The Movie Storybook by James Ponti.

Comics
To support the release of the film in 1982, Disney briefly ran a Sunday comic strip adaptation of the film.

In 2003, 88 MPH solicited a miniseries titled Tron 2.0: Derezzed. This comic was canceled before any issues were released.

In 2005, Slave Labor Graphics announced its six-issue miniseries, Tron: The Ghost in the Machine. The first issue was released in April 2006, the second issue in November of the same year. The comic book explores the concept of making a backup copy of a User within the computer system, and how that artificial intelligence might be materialized into the real world. The comic book was written by Landry Walker and Eric Jones, with art in the first two issues by Louie De Martinis. The artist on the last three issues was Mike Shoykhet.

The comic from Slave Labor Graphics opens with a detailed history of the Tron universe, providing this previously unseen background on the events that allowed Ed Dillinger and the MCP to rise to power:

Marvel Comics released a two issue miniseries entitled Tron: Betrayal in October 2010. The story takes place a year after the original film. In January 2011, to coincide with the release of the sequel Tron: Legacy, Marvel also released a new comic book adaptation of the original 1982 film. Tron: Original Movie Adaptation was written by Peter David with art by Mirco Pierfederici.

A manga version of Tron: Legacy was released by Earth Star Entertainment in Japan on June 30, 2011.

Light cycles

Light cycles were originally fictional vehicles designed by Syd Mead for the simulated world of the Tron universe.  5 real-life replica light cycles were created by Parker Brothers Concepts in Florida, one of which was sold by Sotheby's for a reported $77,000.

These futuristic two-wheeled vehicles resemble motorcycles and create walls of colored light. The vehicles were primarily used in a competition between humanoid computer programs, similar to the 1976 arcade game Blockade, which was the first of a genre called Snake. Players are in constant motion on a playfield, creating a wall of light behind them as they move.  If players hit a wall, their light cycle explodes, placing them out of the game; the last player in the game wins. Since the original display in Tron, there have been numerous adaptations, as well as references in popular culture.

A light cycle toy, in red and yellow versions, was produced by Tomy as part of the merchandising for the Tron film, along with action figures scaled to fit inside the toy cycles. Bootleg versions of Tomy's design were produced by other toy manufacturers that came in a wide variety of colors, including blue and silver, but were noticeably smaller than the Tomy-produced toy, too small in fact to accommodate one of the Tomy action figures.

Light cycles make a return in Tron: Legacy, with new designs by Daniel Simon.  According to the press conference at Comic-Con 2009, a new vehicle appears called a "Light Runner," a two-seat version of the light cycle.  It is said to be very fast, and has the unique ability to go off the grid on its own power. We also get a glimpse at Kevin Flynn's own cycle, a "Second Generation Light Cycle" designed in 1989 by Flynn and “rumor has it it's still the fastest thing on the grid.”  It incorporates some of the look of both films.

The tie-in video game Tron: Evolution, which is set between the events of Tron and Tron: Legacy, features light cycles in sections of the single-player mode and in certain game maps for the multiplayer mode. Light cycle use in multiplayer gives players the option to shift back and forth between cycle and foot travel at will, and provides multiple attack and defensive options beyond the classic "boxing in" of an opponent. In addition, the light cycles of Evolution can pass through their own light trails (and the trails of allied players) unharmed.

A more classic interpretation of the light cycle game is shown in the Wii-game Tron Evolution: Battle Grids, which is primarily based on offline multi- or single-player matches. These light cycle battles do not allow the player to pass through their own trail, but do allow passage through teammates' trails. There is also no option to travel on foot.

See also
Golden age of arcade video games

Notes

References

External links

 
Tron films
Science fiction franchises
Works set in computers
Mass media franchises introduced in 1982